West Swagg Music Group is an American independent record label, established in 2010, that was located in the West Coast and designed to sign and distribute the music from West Coast Artists.

West Swagg Music Group currently has a label deal with Bungalo Records, with full distribution through Universal Music Group Distribution. Paul Ring, CEO of Bungalo/Universal Records, has formed a partnership with West Swagg Music Group.

Artists 
Prizzy
iRome
Kontroversy Committee
L.C
Lover Boii Swagg
CeCe Peniston
Nene Ali

See also 
 List of record labels

References

External links
Official website

American record labels
Labels distributed by Universal Music Group